Laothoe populeti is a species of moth of the family Sphingidae. It is found from eastern Turkey and Armenia, through north-eastern Iraq, the Iranian plateau and the central Asian republics of Turkmenistan, Uzbekistan, Tajikistan, Kyrgyzstan, Kazakhstan and north-western China.

The wingspan is 70–120 mm. It is similar to Laothoe populi, but with no violet tint to the grey pigmentation, which is itself paler and faintly pinkish orange. There are individuals with a reddish tone (known as form vera).

There are probably two generations per year. Adults have been recorded from April to May and again from July to August.

The larvae feed on Populus and Salix species.

References

Laothoe (moth)
Moths described in 1870